Wolfgang Katzheimer the elder (German: Wolfgang Katzheimer der Ältere; c. 1430 — 1508, Bamberg) was a German painter, draftsman, and designer. From 1465 he was master of a workshop in Bamberg that produced paintings and woodcarvings.

Very little of his work has survived: two stone carvings that he designed and 22 woodcuts based on his drawings. No surviving paintings can with certainty be attributed to him.

Katzheimer had two sons, Wolfgang Katzheimer the younger and Bernhard Katzheimer, who were both minor artists. It is possible that he was a close relative of the painter Lorenz Katzheimer, who was likely the anonymous master known as Master L. Cz.

Gallery

References

External links 

Entry on the Union List of Artist Names

15th-century German painters
German male painters
16th-century German painters
1430 births
1508 deaths